Katherine Flanders, known as Kate Flanders, is the current State Secretary of the Queensland Labor Party. She has held the position since 3 June 2022, taking over from Julie-Ann Campbell. Prior to the position with the party, Flanders worked for the Together Union, where she held the position of Assistant Branch Secretary from 2010 to 2020/21 She has also worked for the Australian Council of Trade Unions (ACTU) and was an administrative officer in private hospitals as well as a research assistant at Griffith University. Flanders holds a degree in law from the University of Queensland, and was born in Mackay, Queensland.

On the 3 June contest for Queensland State Secretary of the Labor Party, Flanders won. Both Flanders and the election of State Secretary of the Queensland Labor Party were criticised by CFMEU State Secretary Michael Ravbar, who called the election an “unedifying scramble” to replace Campbell given its closeness to the federal election (21 May), as it would mean there would be no effort to examine the credentials of the candidates. Further adding of Flanders: “It just beggars belief that the candidate mentioned as front-runner, Kate Flanders, was a former organiser with the Together Union which backed Campbell Newman at the time of his 2012 election.”

References  

Australian Labor Party politicians
Living people
Australian women in politics
Year of birth missing (living people)